The Portland Sand Formation is a limestone formation from the Tithonian stage of the Jurassic period on the Isle of Portland, Dorset, England. The formation is made up largely of dolomites but includes siltstones and fine-grained sandstones in its lower parts. It is a sub unit of the Portland Group.

References 

Geology of Dorset
Tithonian Stage
Jurassic System of Europe